During the 1998–99 English football season, Coventry City competed in the FA Premier League.

Season summary
Coventry City finished 15th in the Premiership – four places lower than last season – but were never in any real danger of being relegated, despite the loss of key striker Dion Dublin to local rivals Aston Villa.

The biggest news of Coventry's season was the announcement of a move to a new 45,000-seat stadium at Foleshill, which was anticipated to be ready by 2002. Manager Gordon Strachan then signed Moroccan international football star Mustapha Hadji, knowing that it would be important to have a top quality team to match the forthcoming new home.

Final league table

Results summary

Results by round

Results
Coventry City's score comes first

Legend

FA Premier League

FA Cup

League Cup

Squad

Left club during season

Reserve squad

Transfers

In

Out

Transfers in:  £11,300,000
Transfers out:  £14,150,000
Total spending:  £2,850,000

References

Coventry City F.C. seasons
Coventry City